Charlene Gubb (née Halapua, born 17 January 1988) is a New Zealand rugby union player. She scored a try on her debut for New Zealand against Canada at the 2015 Women's Rugby Super Series in Calgary. She started in all three games of the series.

Biography 
Gubb was born in Tofoa, Tonga and migrated to New Zealand at the age of 11. She attended Massey High School.

Gubb played netball for North Auckland and Waitakere before switching to rugby. Her husband Charlie Gubb played for the Warriors and Raiders in the NRL.

Gubb came off the bench in the Black Ferns 67–3 thrashing of Australia in 2016. She also featured in the second test match as the Wallaroos went down 29–3. She was named in the Black Ferns squad for their November tour of England, Canada and Ireland. She featured in all three victories, narrowly beating the English 25–20 and winning against the Canadians and Irish in Dublin.

In 2018 Gubb turned out for the Brumbies women in the Super W competition. In June 2022, she was one of 26 Black Ferns who were officially capped at a special event in Auckland.

References

External links 

 Black Ferns Profile

1988 births
Living people
New Zealand female rugby union players
New Zealand women's international rugby union players